West Van Lear is an unincorporated community in Johnson County, Kentucky, United States. Even though it is unincorporated, it has a post office and its own ZIP code (41268). It has a small grocery store, a volunteer fire department, and a community center.

West Van Lear's post office was established on April 29, 1912, with James H. Price as postmaster.

Demographics

References

Unincorporated communities in Johnson County, Kentucky
Unincorporated communities in Kentucky